The Fort Moore Pioneer Memorial is a large stone memorial wall built in 1957 on part of the original location of Fort Moore facing North Hill Street, in Los Angeles, California.

Description and history 
The memorial was completed in phases; while the art wall was completed in 1956, the pylon, waterfall and memorial wall were not completed until 1957 or 1958. The final funding was secured in 1957. The official dedication of the memorial was on July 3, 1958.

As the largest bas-relief military monument in the United States, it honors the Mormon Battalion, the U.S. 1st Dragoons, and the New York Volunteers who raised the American flag over the fort on July 4, 1847, at the first Independence Day in Los Angeles.

Funded by the County of Los Angeles, the City of Los Angeles, the Los Angeles Board of Education and the Department of Water and Power, the memorial was designed by Kazumi Adachi and Dike Nagano and dedicated on July 3, 1957.

Other panels represent the agricultural and spiritual foundation of the region; transportation that shaped the city at the end of the 19th century; and the crucial role that water and electricity play in a large modern city.

It was out of service since a 1977 drought, and turned on in December 2018 after restoration work was completed.

References

External links

 

1957 sculptures
Downtown Los Angeles
Monuments and memorials in California
Outdoor sculptures in Greater Los Angeles
Sculptures of men in California
Stone sculptures in California